Diego Jota Martins (born 4 February 1987) is a Brazilian professional footballer who plays as a midfielder  for FC Finnkurd in the Kolmonen.

Martins was born in Joinville, Brazil. He has played for top-level Brazilian club Coritiba Football Club for seven years,  having five years of professional contract. He has previously played for several teams in Brazil and for TTM F.C. and PTT Rayong F.C. in the Thai Premier League. In the 2012–13 season he played seven matches for Motor Lublin in the Polish II liga. Martins was signed by FC Jazz in April 2014 with a year-long contract appearing on 28 matches in that season.

References

External links
 

Living people
1987 births
People from Joinville
Brazilian footballers
Association football midfielders
América Futebol Clube (SP) players
Motor Lublin players
Clube Atlético Metropolitano players
FC Jazz players
Brazilian expatriate footballers
Brazilian expatriate sportspeople in Thailand
Expatriate footballers in Thailand
Brazilian expatriate sportspeople in Poland
Expatriate footballers in Poland
Brazilian expatriate sportspeople in Finland
Expatriate footballers in Finland
Sportspeople from Santa Catarina (state)